The "American Law Library" series are a series of Chinese books that are translated from American law textbooks.

In 2000, the Public Affairs Section of the American Embassy to the People's Republic of China and the China University of Political Science and Law Publishing House—as part of the US and China Presidential Rule of Law Initiative—agreed to cooperate to translate hundreds of American law textbooks into Chinese and publish Chinese editions.

List of translated books
 Jonathan Rosenoer, Cyber law: the Law of the Internet
 Karl N. Llewellyn, The Common Law Tradition
 Edward H. Levi, An Introduction to the Legal Reasoning
 Richard A. Posner, Overcoming  Law
 Cass R. Sunstein, Free Markets and Social Justice
 Henry Hansmann, The Ownership of Enterprise
 Paul Brest, Sanford Lexinson, Akhil Reed Amar, et al., Process of Constitutional Decisionmaking
 Robert A. Gorman, Basic Text on Labor Law: Unionization and Collective Bargaining
 Robert C. Ellickson, Order without Law: How Neighbors Settle Disputes
 David G. Epstein et al., Bankruptcy
 Roscoe Pound, Law and Morals
 Robert C. Stevens, Law School
 Mirjan R. Damaska, Evidence Law Adrift
 Thomas Lee Hazen, The Law of Securities Regulation
 Howell E. Jackson, Edward L. Symmons, Regulation of Financial Institutions
 Morton J. Horwitz, The Warren Court and the Pursuit of Justice
 Eric A. Posner, Law and Social Norms
 George P. Fletcher, Basic Concepts of Criminal Law
 Christopher Wolfe, Judicial Activism
 Richard A. Epstein, Simple Rules for a Complex World
 Robert P. Merges, Intellectual Property in the New Technological Age
 John W. Strong, Mccormick on Evidence
 Stephen Judge, Business Law
 Mary Kay Kane et al., Civil Procedure
 Wayne R. LaFave, Criminal Procedure
 Morton J. Horwitz, The Transformation of American Law
 Stephen N. Subrin et al., Civil Procedure: Doctrine
 Kate Standley, Family Law
 Robert G. Mccloskey and Sanford Levinson, The American Supreme Court
 Oliver Wendell Holmes, Jr., Common Law
 George B. Vold et al., Theoretical Criminology 
 Henry Mather, Contract Law and Morality
 Stephen M. Feldman, American Legal Thoughts from Pre-medoenism to Post-modernism
 Akhil Reed Amar, The Constitution and Criminal Procedure: First Principles
 John Finnis, Natural Law and Natural Rights
 P. S. Atiyah, Form and Substance in Anglo-American Law
 Judith N. Shklar, Legalism: Law, Morals and Political Trials
 Matthias W. Stecher, Webvertising: Unfair Competition and Trademarks on the Internet
 Graham Romp, Game Theory Introduction and Applications
 H. L. A. Hart, Causation in the Law
 Bernard Schwartz, A History of the Supreme Court
 Louis Henkin, International Law: Politics and Values
 David Luban, Legal Modernism
 Stephen B. Goldberg, Frank E. A. Sander, Nancy H. Rogers, Sarah Rudolph Cole, Dispute Resolution: Negotiation, Mediation, and Other Processes

External links
 Introduction to American Law Library at US Embassy to China

Series of books